Pacham in Mazandaran may refer to:
 Pachet
 Pajim